Harry Wolff may refer to:

 Harry Wolff (boxer) (1905–1987), Swedish boxer
 Harry Wolff (booking agent) (1890–1934), American booking agent
Harry Woolf, Baron Woolf (born 1933), British lawyer and life peer